Cristina Direito Branco a.k.a. Branca (born 15 March 1985) is an Angolan handball player for Primeiro de Agosto and Angolan national team.

She plays on the Angola women's national handball team and participated at the 2011 and 2013 World Women's Handball Championships in Brazil and Serbia. She competed for the Angolan team at the 2012 Summer Olympics in London. She also competed for the Angolan team at the 2016 Summer Olympics in Rio de Janeiro. She was the flag bearer for Angola during the closing ceremonies in Rio.

She plays for the club 1º de Agosto.

References

External links
 

1985 births
Living people
Angolan female handball players
Handball players at the 2012 Summer Olympics
Handball players at the 2016 Summer Olympics
Olympic handball players of Angola
Handball players from Luanda
African Games gold medalists for Angola
African Games medalists in handball
Competitors at the 2015 African Games